René-Jean Clot (19 January 1913, Algiers – 4 November 1997, Clermont-Ferrand) was a French painter, and novelist. His novel,  L'Enfant halluciné, won the 1987 Prix Renaudot.

He corresponded with Albert Camus.

Works
 L’Annonciation à la licorne, coll. « Méditerranéennes » (n°1), Algiers: éditions Edmond Charlot, 1936
Les Gages charnels de l'art français, éditions Charlot Alger, 1941
Paysages africains, Tchad, Tibesti, Fezzan, Borkou, 1945Le noir de la vigne: roman, Gallimard, 1948Fantômes au soleil, éditions Gallimard, 1949Empreintes dans le sol, éditions Gallimard, 1950 Le Poil de la bête, Gallimard, 1951 prix des Deux Magots Le Mat de cocagne, Gallimard, 1953Le Meunier, son fils, l'âne, 1954 Le Bleu d'outre-tombe, Gallimard, 1956 La Querelle des images, édition Pierre Cailler, 1960La révélation: pièce en quatre actes, Gallimard, 1961Le ramoneur de neige: récits,  Gallimard, 1962Arc-en-enfer, Gallimard, 1963La rose de Noël,  Gallimard, 1964 Les Voix dans la cour, suivi de La nuit n'est pas si noire et de Un feu de bois vert, Gallimard, 1964Le Cœur pourpre, édition Pierre Cailler, 1965La educación artística, Jean Wahl, Planeta, 1976, Un amour interdit, éditions Grasset, 1984 L'Enfant halluciné, 1987; Librairie générale française, 1989, Le Mirage de l'orge, recueil de nouvelles, éditions l'Âge-d'Homme, 1987 La Neige en enfer, éditions Moren-sell, 1988 La Peinture aux abois, éditions Conti-Bourin, 1988 Les Larmes de Lucifer, B. Grasset, 1989Une patrie de sel ou le souvenir d'Alger, librairie bleue. 1992Pourquoi les femmes pleurent elles, éditions Grasset et Fasquelle, 1997L'amour épouse sa nuit, éditions Grasset et Fasquelle, 1997Charhouz le voyant,'' éditions Grasset et Fasquelle, 1997

References

External links

http://www.christies.com/LotFinder/lot_details.aspx?intObjectID=4655072

1913 births
1997 deaths
People from Algiers
Prix Renaudot winners
Prix des Deux Magots winners
20th-century French novelists
20th-century French male writers
French male novelists